South Korea (IOC designation:Korea) participated in the 1966 Asian Games held in Bangkok, Thailand from December 9, 1966 to December 20, 1966.

Medal summary

Medal table

Medalists

References

Korea, South
1966
Asian Games